Saint Pius Tenth School is located in greater Rochester, New York area and is affiliated with the Roman Catholic Diocese of Rochester and certified by the State of New York and accredited by Middle States Association of Colleges and Schools. It offers programs in Pre-School through Grade 6 and have an enrollment of approximately 333 students.

Programs and services that are offered at the school include:
 Physical Education
 Music
 Art
 Computer/Technology
 Library
 Full Day Kindergarten
 Reading and Math
 Intervention Services for Reading, Writing, and Math
 Hot Lunch Program
 Full size Indoor Gym
 Before and After School Care

Saint Pius Tenth School is located at 3000 Chili Avenue, in the town of Chili.  It is located in the western part of Monroe County, New York.

Private elementary schools in New York (state)
Schools in Monroe County, New York